High Down may refer to:

 High Down (HM Prison), prison in Surrey, England
 High Down (Isle of Wight), area of downland on Isle of Wight, England
 High Down Rocket Test Site preserved site, Isle of Wight, England

See also
 Highdown (disambiguation)